ENAH may refer to:
ENAH (gene), a gene [Enabled homolog (Drosophila)] located on chromosome 1 in humans
Escuela Nacional de Antropología e Historia, the national educational institute for anthropological and historical studies in Mexico City, Mexico